Robert Clarke James (1918 – September 25, 2004) was an American mathematician who worked in functional analysis.

Biography
James attended UCLA as an undergraduate, where his father was a professor.  As a devout Quaker, he was a conscientious objector during World War II.

He obtained his PhD at Caltech in 1946 under the direction of Aristotle Demetrius Michal.  He spent a year as a Benjamin Peirce Fellow at Harvard and joined the faculty at UC Berkeley.  In 1950, during the loyalty oath controversy, James refused to sign the oath and moved to Haverford College.  Later he was the founding math department chair both at Harvey Mudd College and at the Claremont Graduate University.

James constructed a number of counterexamples in the theory of Banach spaces, including James' space and James' tree space.  He also characterized reflexivity for Banach spaces with an unconditional Schauder basis and proved an eponymous compactness criterion.

With his father  (a professor at UCLA and long-time editor of Mathematics Magazine) he published a mathematical dictionary which went through several editions.

James was made a Fellow of the American Association for the Advancement of Science in 1978.

Selected works

References 

Functional analysts
20th-century American mathematicians
1918 births
2004 deaths
Fellows of the American Association for the Advancement of Science
University of California, Los Angeles alumni
California Institute of Technology alumni
Harvey Mudd College faculty
20th-century Quakers
American Quakers